RedTeleSistema (RTS), is a private television station in Ecuador. The channel is owned by Albavisión. The channel was the first to operate in Ecuador since its inception.

History
What is now RTS was the first television station in Guayaquil. In 1959, José Rosenbaum bought some equipment from his native Germany. After a few experiments the station signed on for the first time on December 12, 1960, running from 5pm to 10pm every evening.

Notable presenters 
Paola Cabezas presented the morning show El Club de la Mañana between 2007 and 2009.

References

External links

Television channels in Ecuador
Spanish-language television stations
Television channels and stations established in 1960